"Man at the Top" is a Bruce Springsteen song written in 1983 at the time of the Born in the U.S.A. recording sessions. It has been performed live by Springsteen three times: during the 1984 and 1985 North American legs of the Born in the U.S.A. Tour at the Alpine Valley Music Theatre in East Troy, Wisconsin on July 12, 1984, at RFK Stadium in Washington, D.C. on August 5, 1985, and 28 years later it made its long-awaited return when it was performed during the final show on the European leg of the Wrecking Ball Tour on July 28, 2013 in Kilkenny, Ireland. The Washington, D.C. performance gained notice from both Time magazine and Springsteen biographer Dave Marsh for its possibly auto-politico-biographical import:
Man at the top says it's lonely up there
If it is, man, I don't careFrom the big white house to the parking lotEverybody wants to be the man at the topThe song went unreleased until it turned up on his 1998 Tracks'' box set.  Meanwhile, and since, "Man at the Top" was kept alive by E Street Band guitarist Nils Lofgren, who renders it in his solo concerts and has described it as his favorite Springsteen song.

References

1984 songs
Bruce Springsteen songs
Songs written by Bruce Springsteen